Walter Blake may refer to:
Walter Blake (politician) (died 1748), Irish aristocrat and politician
Walter Blake (bishop) (died 1758), Irish bishop of Achonry
Sir Walter Blake, 10th Baronet (died 1802) of the Blake baronets
Walter Blake (soccer)

See also
Walter Blake fitz John (died 1508), Irish bishop of Clonmacnoise
Blake (surname)